Platform Gallery is a contemporary art gallery formerly located for 12 years in the Tashiro Kaplan Building in historic Pioneer Square District in Downtown Seattle. It was founded in 2004 by four artists, including Stephen Lyons, who is now sole owner. In late 2016, the gallery moved from its brick and mortar space to exhibiting and selling artworks exclusively online. In art critic Regina Hackett's 2005 Seattle Post-Intelligencer article on Pioneer Square, she credits the galleries with contributing to the neighborhood's "core of cultural tolerance and open-minded experiment". 

The gallery has attracted attention for exhibitions of works on paper as well as contemporary photography and sculpture.

References

External links
 Platform Gallery website

Contemporary art galleries in the United States
Art museums and galleries in Washington (state)
Culture of Seattle
American art dealers
Art galleries established in 2004
2004 establishments in Washington (state)